György Dalos (born 23 September 1943) is a Hungarian Jewish writer and historian. He is best known for his novel 1985, and The Guest from the Future: Anna Akhmatova and Isaiah Berlin.

Life
Dalos was born in Budapest and spent his childhood with his grandparents, as his father had died in 1945 in a labor camp, where he had been sent to as a Jew during World War II. From 1962 to 1967, he studied history at the Lomonossov University in Moscow. He then returned to his native town Budapest to work as a museologist. In 1968, Dalos was accused of "Maoist activities" and was handed seven months prison on probation and a Berufsverbot (professional disqualification) and a publication ban; due to that, he worked as a translator. In 1977, he was among the founders of the opposition movement against the Communist regime of Hungary. In 1988/89 he was co-editor of the East German underground opposition paper Ostkreuz. From 1995 to 1999, Dalos was head of the Institute for Hungarian Culture in Berlin. Since 2009 he is member of the International Council of Austrian Service Abroad.

Dalos lived in Vienna from 1987 to 1995. Since 1995, he has lived in Berlin as a freelance publisher and editor.

Awards
 2010 Leipzig Book Award for European Understanding

Work

 1985 (1983) is a sequel to George Orwell's Nineteen Eighty-Four. This novel begins with the death of Big Brother and reflects an intermediate period between 1984 and a more optimistic future characterized with a decline in orthodoxy of the totalitarian system, struggles of the ensuing powers and the near destruction of the Oceania air force by Eurasia.
 The Circumcision (1990)
 Proletarier aller Lander, entschuldigt mich! (Ende des Ostblockwitzes) (Proletariats of all countries, I apologize! (End of the East Block joke)) (1993)
 The Guest from the Future (1996)
 Der Gottsucher (Godseeker) (1999)
 Ungarn in der Nusschale. Geschichte meines Landes (Hungary in a Nutshell. History of My Country) (2004). In Hungary in a Nutshell Dalos prophetically warns his homeland not to attempt to solve social problems in an authoritarian manner.
 Die Balaton Brigade (2006)
 1956: Aufstand in Ungarn [1956: Uprising in Hungary] (2006)
 Jugenstil (Art Nouveau) (2007)

Articles
 Zum Ende der Diktaturen in Osteuropa: Ein Blick auf Ungarn und die DDR, in: Robertson-von Trotha, Caroline Y. (ed.): Herausforderung Demokratie. Demokratisch, parlamentarisch, gut? (= Kulturwissenschaft interdisziplinär/Interdisciplinary Studies on Culture and Society, Vol. 6), Baden-Baden 2011

External links
 A Peaceless Democracy by Gyorgy Dalos, article, English, June 2009, on the current polarization of the political culture and politics in Hungary.

References

1943 births
Living people
Hungarian writers
Hungarian Jews